DreamPlug is a compact and low power plug computer running Debian Linux, based on Marvell's Kirkwood 88F6281 ARM9E SoC. It is intended to be a device that could act as a web server, a printing server or any other network service. It uses micro-SD internal storage and an external Secure Digital slot, but also offers USB ports and a Serial ATA port to connect external disks.

Improvements over the GuruPlug
The DreamPlug is an evolution of the GuruPlug, based on the SheevaPlug platform.

Apart from internal processor changes, the DreamPlug features a new case design, second Gigabit Ethernet, eSATA, SD slot (and internal microSD slot replacing the internal NAND), audio in/out, and a removable PSU.

Early version of DreamPlug has 802.11 b/g Wi-Fi and Bluetooth 2.1+EDR. It is also shipped with 2 GB microSD card.
Current version has 802.11 b/g/n Wi-Fi and Bluetooth 3.0. It is also shipped with 4 GB microSD card.

See also
 Plug computer

References

External links
 Google code project for DreamPlug

Linux-based devices
Computer storage devices
Computer-related introductions in 2011